Graeme Smith (born June 3, 1979) is a Canadian author and researcher. He worked as a political affairs officer for the United Nations in Afghanistan from 2015 to 2018. He was previously a senior analyst for the International Crisis Group. He has served as a foreign correspondent for The Globe and Mail, a Canadian newspaper.

Career

Smith was hired by The Globe and Mail as a staff reporter in 2001. The newspaper appointed him as bureau chief in Winnipeg (2003), Moscow (2005), Kandahar (2006), Delhi (2010), and Istanbul (2011).

Smith investigated detainees captured by Canadian troops and transferred into Afghan custody in 2007, revealing widespread torture in local jails. This became known as the Canadian Afghan detainee issue. Two weeks later, Ottawa signed a new bilateral agreement with Kabul to protect prisoners. Smith and his colleague Paul Koring won the Michener Award for public service, granted once a year by the Governor General of Canada.

His 2008 multimedia series "Talking to the Taliban" gave viewers the opportunity to watch 42 Taliban insurgents discuss why they fight, and made public the raw video along with articles and short documentaries. The project won several prizes - including an Emmy Award.

During his coverage of the 2011 civil war in Libya, Smith found documents that showed the Chinese government offered large arsenals of weapons to Muammar Gaddafi, in violation of UN sanctions. China apologized.

Other documents Smith discovered in Libya contributed to the scandal over engineering giant SNC-Lavalin's role in the country, and the coverage won three magazine awards. A Royal Canadian Mounted Police investigation resulted in corruption and fraud charges against the company marking an important test of Canada's Corruption of Foreign Public Officials Act. Senior executives were convicted and the company pleaded guilty to fraud. This episode became part of a broader issue known as the SNC-Lavalin affair.

His bestselling book, The Dogs Are Eating Them Now: Our War In Afghanistan, published in 2013 by Knopf/Random House Canada, described the war in southern Afghanistan from 2005 to 2011. The book was nominated for four literary awards and won the Hilary Weston Writers' Trust Prize for Nonfiction, Canada's richest prize for non-fiction. An updated U.S. edition was published in 2014, along with a French translation in 2015.

In 2012, he joined the International Crisis Group as head of the organization's office in Afghanistan. He writes research papers about politics and security, and contributes op-ed articles to publications such as The New York Times, Reuters, and other media outlets.

Selected awards
2014  Shaughnessy Cohen Prize for political writing (short-listed)
2014  RBC Taylor Prize for non-fiction (short-listed)
2014  British Columbia National Award for Canadian non-fiction (short-listed)
2013  Hilary Weston Writers' Trust Prize for Nonfiction (winner)
2013  National Magazine Award for investigative reporting (gold)
2013  National Magazine Award for business reporting (gold)
2013  National Magazine Award for politics and public interest (silver)
2012  National Newspaper Award for international reporting (nominee)
2009  Emmy Award for new approaches to news and documentary
2008  National Newspaper Award for international reporting
2008  National Newspaper Award for multimedia project
2007  Michener Award for public-service journalism
2007  National Newspaper Award for international reporting
2007  Amnesty International award for Canadian print journalism
2002  Edward Goff Penny prize for young Canadian journalists
1999  Canadian Association of Journalists award for investigations

Selected bibliography
Decoding the New Taliban (Hurst, 2009), book chapter
The Rule of Law in Afghanistan: Missing in Inaction (Cambridge University Press, 2010), book chapter
The Dogs Are Eating Them Now: Our War In Afghanistan (Knopf, 2013)
Afghanistan's Insurgency After The Transition (International Crisis Group, 2014)

References

External links 
 International Crisis Group
 PEN America profile

Living people
The Globe and Mail people
Canadian non-fiction writers
1979 births